Kevin Christie may refer to:
 Kevin Christie (footballer) (born 1976), Scottish footballer
 Kevin Christie (politician) (born 1950), American politician